The discography of Pidżama Porno, a Polish punk rock/alternative rock band, consists of nine studio albums, nine singles and two video albums. The band, who formed in Poznań in 1989, consists of vocalist Krzysztof Grabowski, guitarists Andrzej Kozakiewicz and Sławomir Mizerkiewicz, bassist Julian Piotrowiak and drummer Rafal Piotrowiak.

Studio albums

Live albums

Singles

Music videos

Video releases
Finalista (DVD: 2007) (tour video)
Dwadzieścia (DVD: 2008)

External links 
 Pidżama Porno discography
 Pidżama Porno clips

Discographies of Polish artists
Punk rock group discographies